Tani Mahalleh (also Romanized as Tānī Maḩalleh; also known as Ta’anī Maḩalleh) is a village in Chubar Rural District, Ahmadsargurab District, Shaft County, Gilan Province, Iran. At the 2006 census, its population was 295, in 83 families.

References 

Populated places in Shaft County